Mt. San Antonio College (Mt. SAC) is a public community college in Walnut, California. It offers more than 260 degree and certificate programs, 25 support programs, and more than 50 student clubs and athletic programs, including counseling and tutoring. The college offers associate degrees, career education, community recreation courses, ESL, adult education, and youth summer programs.

History
After World War II, local leaders anticipated the return of young people to college. Four local high school districts voted to approve the formation of the Mt. San Antonio Community College District in December 1945. The board wasted little time. They immediately began to meet on December 26, 1945, and set out to find a suitable location and hire staff. They leased from the state of California a former U.S. Naval hospital located on 445 acres in what was unincorporated Walnut. The land had buildings from as early as 1919, when it was a home for wayward boys. It had also been the State Narcotic Hospital before the war.

The lease began on July 1, 1946, and a newly hired staff immediately set out to open a college and begin to offer classes that fall. With a meager budget of $191,790, faculty and staff worked relentlessly to gather furniture and supplies, design courses, and register students. Family members and students voluntarily pitched in to help collect supplies and paint walls. The school opened for classes on September 16, 1946, with 682 registered students taking classes in programs organized under 7 divisions and 12 departments.

Campus
Sitting on 420 acres in Walnut, California, Mt. San Antonio College is strategically located in the center of the district it serves. While the college accepts students from outside of the district and even internationally, its district focuses on serving communities on the eastern edge of Los Angeles County, including Baldwin Park, Bassett, Charter Oak, Covina, Diamond Bar, the southern portion of Glendora, Hacienda Heights, City of Industry, Irwindale, La Puente, La Verne, Pomona, Rowland Heights, San Dimas, Valinda, Walnut, and West Covina.

The college has invested more than $500 million in updating its facilities through public support of Measure R and Measure RR bonds. The college has a 250-acre farm; a working veterinary hospital; new science classrooms and laboratory facilities; a music, dance, and theater building; multi-media/internet connected classrooms; a new baseball complex; a football field; a putting green; two soccer fields; and is home of the world-famous Mt. SAC Relays. It has an Olympic size swimming pool, tennis courts, and a working farm which includes horses, cattle, sheep, swine, and a canine facility that works with a greyhound rescue group to rehabilitate retired racing dogs each semester. The school also has a  wildlife sanctuary that supports a large variety of native species of birds, mammals, and insects. It consists of a lake, swamp, stream, pond, meadow, and forested area. It is one of the last "safe" places for nature to exist in Walnut due to increased development and a growing population.

The Randall Planetarium has been open since 1968. There are more projects in progress, the latest being a modern agricultural sciences complex, including a working animal hospital, set to complete construction in spring 2011. Construction has also begun on a new Design Technology building. More projects are also expected in the next few years as funds from a recently voter approved measure come in. Located on campus are several campus cafes and a "Common Grounds" area.

Academics

Mt. SAC has an aviation and aircraft maintenance program. Through this program, Mt SAC offers Associate of Science degrees in both Aviation Science and Commercial Flight. The school has partnerships with four-year schools to which students can arrange to receive a bachelor's degree. For example, the Mt SAC aviation program has an on-campus partnership with Southern Illinois University to offer a Bachelor of Science degree in Aviation Management. Mt. SAC is one of 36 colleges in the United States to offer the College Training Initiative (CTI) program through the FAA. This program attracts students from across the United States. It trains students to be air traffic controllers for the FAA.

Besides air traffic control, Mt. SAC has the largest Associate of Science, Commercial Flight degree program in California. It maintains a flight training association on and off campus at nearby Brackett Airport, with a hangar and facilities made possible through donations from Sophia Clarke (renowned for also providing generous gifts for the modern and stately, state-of-the-art Sophia B. Clarke theater and its adjacent equally photogenic edifices). Its flying team is ranked as the best among community colleges in the western United States from 1991 to 2006. In 2000, 2002, 2005, and 2013, the flying team ranked #1 among community colleges in the United States. Also in 2005, and in 1987, the school was the recipient of the Loening Trophy, recognizing the school as having the nation's Best Aviation Program. The Mt SAC Flying team is a member of National Intercollegiate Flying Association and Pacific Coast Intercollegiate Flying Association.

Student life

Associated Students is the student government organization at Mt. San Antonio College and serves as the official voice of the student body. Its budget, of more than $600,000, is generated by an optional "Student Activities" fee paid by students during the fall and spring semesters. Associated Students coordinates and sponsors several events for the student body. Events and sponsorships include the following: campus holiday celebration, celebrity speakers, women's history month activities, cultural celebrations, commencement rehearsal, awards and recognition ceremonies, weekend college tours, and the transfer achievement celebration. Associated Students officers include members of the executive board, Student Senate, and Student Court.

Public speaking
Mt. SAC has a national award-winning forensics team. The program has won numerous national and regional speech and debate tournaments, including the Phi Rho Pi national community college tournament, the American Forensics Association (AFA) national undergraduate tournament, as well as many Readers Theater championships. Most recently, the team captured the national title at the 2013, 2014, and 2019 Phi Rho Pi tournaments and won first place Individual Events Sweepstakes, fourth place Debate Sweepstakes, and first place Overall Sweepstakes. In 2011, the team won the Sylvia Mariner Perpetual Sweepstakes Award for earning accumulative points – an honor Mt. SAC last won 12 years beforehand in 1999. Coaches John Vitullo (2011) and Danny Cantrell (2021) were awarded the Phi Rho Pi Distinguished Service Award, which is the highest Phi Rho Pi honor awarded to a coach.

Chamber singers
Mt. SAC's choral music department includes the award-winning Chamber Singers. Notable achievements include "Choir of the World" in 2007 at the famed Eisteddfod International Music Competition in Wales. In addition to their world title, the mixed group also won three gold medals for their performances in the Youth Choir, Mixed Choir, and Folk Song Choir divisions, making them the choir with the most gold medals won at any of the 61 Eisteddfod competitions.

Fermata Nowhere 
Mt. SAC's TTBB a cappella group, Fermata Nowhere, is the only community college a cappella group to win an International Championship of Collegiate A Cappella (ICCA) title. They qualified for ICCA finals in 2004 and 2009, where they placed 2nd and 1st, respectively. In 2020, The A Cappella Archive ranked Fermata Nowhere at #15 out of all ICCA-competing ensembles.

Athletics 

The Mt. San Antonio College (Mt. SAC) Athletics Program teams, known as the "Mounties", have captured a total of 76 California Community College Athletic Association (CCCAA) state championships, with 49 titles coming since 2000. Mt. SAC currently fields 23 intercollegiate sports including: baseball (M), basketball (M & W), beach volleyball (W), cross country (M & W), football (M), golf (M & W), soccer (M & W), softball (W), swimming (M & W), tennis (M & W), track and field (M & W), volleyball (W), water polo (M & W), and wrestling (M). Mt. SAC competes in the South Coast Conference in most sports, with golf (Orange Empire), wrestling (So Cal Wrestling Alliance) and football (SoCal Football Association - National Division Central Conference) hosted in other conferences.

In 2015, Mt. SAC Athletics captured the 2014–2015 Learfield/IMG Sports Director's Cup, which is awarded to the nation's top overall athletics programs at the NCAA (I, II, III), NAIA, and community college levels. The Mounties have also captured nine Daktronics National Association of Two-Year College Administrators of Athletics (NATYCAA) Cup Championships, which is awarded to the western United States top overall community college athletics program. Since its inception in 2004, Mt. SAC has also captured five second-place trophies and finished in fourth place and sixth place.

The Mt. SAC track and field/cross country programs led all Mt. SAC programs with a combined total of 30 CCCAA championships (men's track 10, women's track 11, men's cross country 1, women's cross country 8). For the past ten years, women's basketball has led all sports with five state championships and four additional top four state championship finishes. Men's soccer has four state championships (two national championships) and three additional top four state championship finishes. Women's softball has two state championships and five additional top four state championship finishes. Football has three state championships (two national championships) and three additional top two state championship finishes.

Mt. SAC Relays

This event is held annually in April over a three-day period and attracts around 15,000 athletes from more than 150 colleges and universities and 150 high schools throughout the world. The relays are hosted in the college's stadium, Hilmer Lodge Stadium (12,500 expandable seating), which is named after Mt. SAC's first track and field/cross country coach. The stadium has nine 48" running lanes, 86' X 40' Daktronics screen, tifgreen Bermuda natural grass, Musco LED lighting, meeting rooms and a practice track facility with a Field Turf Field and field event practice facilities.

Famous participants at the Mt. SAC Relays include:

 Randy Barnes
 Ato Boldon
 Leroy Burrell
 Joaquim Cruz
 Gail Devers
 Stacy Dragila
 Allyson Felix
 Maurice Greene
 Allen Johnson
 Marion Jones
 Jackie Joyner-Kersee
 Bernard Lagat
 Carl Lewis
 Michael Marsh
 Noureddine Morceli
 Edwin Moses
 Maria de Lurdes Mutola
 Merlene Ottey
 Mike Powell
 Bob Seagren
 Mike Tully
 Kevin Young

Cross Country Invitational 

Since the first event in 1948, the Mt. SAC Cross Country Invitational has grown to be the largest event of its kind in the world. It is often rich in running tradition as generations within families may have run it in the past. Mt. SAC is considered one of the most challenging cross country courses in the nation. The races all take place over the course of two weekends usually in October.

The runners start on a long (former) airstrip and run over three hills. The Valley Loop is a flat loop in the beginning of the race where runners usually overtake others. The first mile, due to the flat and hard surface is extremely quick. This mile is immediately followed by the switchbacks up the side of the first hill. These consist of four tight-knit hairpin turns. The switchbacks are very technical as the runners are often closely packed entering this area, and the hill itself is both steep and loosely packed. Arguably, the most challenging obstacle is the infamous "poop out" hill, which is the steepest hill on the course (as well as one of the shortest). The final climb runners must conquer before a steep descent to the flat finish area is Reservoir Hill, which is a steady uphill. The end of the race loops back to the beginning (on the airstrip), passing behind where the runners for the next race are staged. It is also designed for speed and wraps right around the spectator area for a finish at the gate entering Hilmer Lodge Stadium. The current course high school record holders are Boys 14:23, Austin Tamagno (Brea Olinda), 2014, and Girls 15:49, Claudia Lane (Malibu), 2017.

Notable alumni
 Brett Tomko, former MLB player
 Alfonso Boone, former NFL player
 Sammie Burroughs, former NFL player
 Anthony Calvillo, Canadian Football League (CFL) player, pro football's all-time passing yardage leader
 Javier Castro, professional soccer player
 Ronald Cheng, Hong Kong singer and actor
 Mark Clear (born 1956), major league baseball two-time All Star relief pitcher
 Kevin Craft, former quarterback at UCLA
 Jules Cruz, professional a cappella singer, member of The Filharmonic. Featured on Pitch Perfect 2 and Season 4 of The Sing-Off on NBC
 Tommy Haynes, former NFL and USFL Player
 Dan Henderson, professional mixed martial arts (MMA) fighter
 Mike Hohensee, professional football player (United States Football League and CFL) and coach (Arena Football League)
 Bruce Irvin, NFL player
 Avi Kaplan, Grammy Award-winning arranger and singer, former member of Pentatonix
 Joe Keough, former MLB player
 Giovanni Lanaro, two-time Olympic pole vaulter, Mexican champion/record holder
 Chris McAlister, former NFL player
 Gary Miller, U.S. Representative
 Sona Movsesian, executive assistant and podcaster
 Halakilangi Muagututia, former AFL player
 Antonio Pierce, former NFL player 
 Bob Seagren Olympic gold medalist
 Rocky Seto, former NFL coach
 Sam Shepard, playwright, actor, and musician
 Les Shy, former NFL player
 Nu'u Tafisi, former NFL player
 Edward Ulloa, attorney and former criminal prosecutor
 Javier Vazquez, wrestler, MMA fighter
 Delanie Walker, NFL player
 Taco Wallace, former NFL player
 Chris Woodward, former MLB player and coach
 Shawn Wooten, former MLB player
 Tony Zendejas, former NFL player
Nadya Suleman, Octomom
Gopi Rathod, Research Scholar

References

 
California Community Colleges
Walnut, California
San Gabriel Valley
Schools accredited by the Western Association of Schools and Colleges
Universities and colleges in Los Angeles County, California
1946 establishments in California
Educational institutions established in 1946
Cross country running courses in California